Katerina Izmailova is a 1966 Soviet film adaptation of Dmitri Shostakovich's opera Lady Macbeth of the Mtsensk District, directed by Mikhail Shapiro. It was entered into the 1967 Cannes Film Festival.

Cast
 Galina Vishnevskaya as Katerina Lvovna Izmailova
 Artyom Inozemtsev as Sergei
 Nikolai Boyarsky as Zinovi Borisovich
 Aleksandr Sokolov as Boris Timofeyevich
 Roman Tkachuk as Village Drunk
 Tatyana Gavrilova as Sonetka
 Konstantin Adashevsky
 Igor Bogolyubov
 Lyubov Malinovskaya
 Vyacheslav Radziyevsky as Voice of Zinovi Borisovich (as V. Radziyevsky)
 Valentina Reka as Voice of Sonetka (as V. Reka)
 Vera Titova
 Konstantin Tyagunov
 Aleksandr Vedernikov as Voice of Boris Timofeyevich

References

External links

1966 films
1966 in the Soviet Union
1960s Russian-language films
1966 drama films
Lenfilm films
Soviet opera films
Films scored by Dmitri Shostakovich